De/Vision is a German synthpop musical group formed in 1988. The band started as a quartet consisting of Thomas Adam, Steffen Keth, Stefan Blender, and Markus Ganssert. Blender left the band in 1991 and Ganssert departed in 2000. The name De/Vision is a play on words. The majority of the band's lyrics are in English, but they have had some songs in German.

In 2000, Keth started a side project as the vocalist with Green Court, called 'Green Court featuring De/Vision'. The band with remaining members Keth and Adam were then signed to Drakkar Records and Sony BMG in Europe, and Dancing Ferret Discs in North America.  The band is currently signed to Metropolis Records in North America. Since 1994 the band has released a new studio album of original material roughly every 1.5 years, until their 2012 album Rockets and Swords.

In 2009, the band started their own label, Popgefahr, primarily to release their own works as a response to the difficulty of garnering label support.

On 25 May 2018, the single "They Won't Silence Us" was released, and on 22 June, the new studio album Citybeats was released by the band. The LP was supported by a tour that started on 21 April 2018 and ended on 2 February 2019.

Members
 Steffen Keth - vocals, composition (1988-present)
 Thomas Adam - synthesizer, songwriting, vocals (1988-present)

Former members
 Markus Ganssert - synthesizer, songwriting, composition (1988-2000)
 Stefan Blender - synthesizer, composition (1988-1991)

Touring members
 Markus Koestner - drums (2005-2007, 2012–present)
 Lars Baumgart - guitars (1998-2007)
 Achim Färber - drums (2000-2004)

Discography

Studio albums
World Without End (1994)
Unversed In Love (1995)
Fairyland? (1996)
Monosex (1998)
Void (2000)
Two (2001)
Devolution (2003)
6 Feet Underground (2004)
Subkutan (2006)
NOOB (2007)
Popgefahr (2010)
Rockets and Swords (2012)
13 (2016)
Citybeats (2018)

References

External links

Official website
Official website 1988-2003
SHOUT! Online interview with Thomas (De/Vision) (January 2007)
SHOUT! Online interview with Thomas (De/Vision) (January 2006)
SHOUT! Online interview with Thomas (De/Vision) (June 2004)

German musical trios
German synthpop groups
Musical groups established in 1988